St Helen's Church is an Anglican church in Brant Broughton, Lincolnshire, England. It is a Grade I listed building.

History
St Helen's Church a medieval church dedicated to 'St Helen' dating from the 13th century. It was heavily restored by the Rector, Canon Frederick Heathcote Sutton and the architect George Frederick Bodley between 1874 and 1876.

The chancel (a rebuild of 1812) was entirely demolished by Bodley in 1874. He added the reredos in 1887. The bells were repaired and refurbished in 1881 by John Taylor of Loughborough.

The wrought ironwork, gates, railings, candlesticks and candelabra were made by the village blacksmith, F. Coldron.

Pevsner described the church as having "one of the most elegant spires of Lincolnshire". According to a survey in 2011 by architect Julian Flannery, the spire is actually 167 feet (51 metres) high. Parts of the church date back to about 1290 though most dates back to about the late 14th century.

There is a  late 15th-century German painting of the Ascension and a piece of Anglo Saxon interlace stonework in the vestry. Under the  tower there are the remains of a 14th-century trinity which has the top half of God The Father missing. There are Green Man bosses to be found in the roof.

Incumbents

 William Warburton 1728 - 1730
 ?
 Revd H Houson ca 1839

 Revd Canon Frederick Heathcote Sutton 1873 - 1889
 Revd Canon Arthur Sutton 1889 - 1924
 ?

Organ

The organ is by Wordsworth and Maskell of Leeds installed in 1876. The organ case was added in 1906.

Churchyard

The churchyard contains the war grave of a Royal Armoured Corps soldier of the Second World War.

Gallery

References

Sources

 St. Helen's Church, Brant Broughton. Church guidebook.
 The Buildings of England, Lincolnshire. Pevsner.

Church of England church buildings in Lincolnshire
Brant Broughton